Slow Country is a Nigerian action-drama film, directed and produced by Eric Aghimien.

The film stars Ivie Okujaye, Sambasa Nzeribe, Tope Tedela, Majid Michel, Richards Brutus, Stephen Damien, Kolade Shasi and Gina Castel.

The film won the Audience Choice Award at the 2016 Africa International Film Festival and gave Sambasa Nzeribe his second consecutive AMVCA for "Best Actor in a Drama".

Plot
A homeless teenage mother (Ivie Okujaye) who gets herself trapped in prostitution and drug trafficking for seven years in order to secure a good life for her son, decides to quit but her boss, a ruthless human and drug trafficker (Sambasa Nzeribe) is not ready to let go of his most trusted cash cow.

Cast
Ivie Okujaye as Kome
Sambasa Nzeribe as Tuvi
Tope Tedela as Osas
Majid Michel as Inspector Dave
Gina Castel as Ola
Brutus Richard as Brasko
Folaremi Agunbiade as Femi
Imoudu 'DJ Moe' Ayonete as Tuvi's Second Man
Inspector Ogbonna as Victor Erabie
Adebayo Thomas as Peter
Emmanuel Ilemobayo as Charger
Kolade Shasi as Pedro
Anthony Igwe as Eugene

Awards and nominations

References

External links
 

Nigerian action drama films
2016 films
English-language Nigerian films
Nigerian thriller drama films
Nigerian action thriller films
Films set in Lagos
2016 thriller drama films
Films shot in Lagos
2016 action thriller films
2010s English-language films